The poetry of the Ottoman Empire, or Ottoman Divan poetry, is little known outside modern Turkey, which forms the heartland of what was once the Ottoman Empire. It is, however, a rich and ancient poetic tradition that lasted for nearly 700 years, and one whose influence can still be felt in the modern Turkish poetic tradition.

Even in modern Turkey, however, Ottoman Divan poetry is a highly specialist subject. Much of this has to do with the fact that Divan poetry is written in Ottoman Turkish, which was written using a variant of the Arabic script and made extensive use of Arabic and Persian words, making the language vastly different from modern Turkish. In its own time, knowledge of this form of literary Turkish was largely limited to the educated classes.

History
The Ottoman Divan poetry tradition embraced the influence of the Persian and, to a lesser extent, Arabic literatures. As far back as the pre-Ottoman Seljuk period in the late 11th to early 14th centuries CE, this influence was already being felt: the Seljuks conducted their official business in the Persian language, rather than in Turkish, and the poetry of the Seljuk court was highly inflected with Persian.

When the Ottoman Empire arose in northwestern Anatolia, it continued this tradition. The most common poetic forms of the Ottoman court, for instance, were derived either directly from the Persian literary tradition (the gazel; the mesnevî), or indirectly through Persian from the Arabic (the kasîde). However, the decision to adopt these poetic forms wholesale led to two important further consequences:

 the poetic meters (Persian: beher (Arabic: بَحْر); Turkish: aruz (Arabic: عَرُوض)) of Persian poetry were adopted.
 Persian- and Arabic-based words were brought into the Turkish language in great numbers, as Turkish words rarely worked well within the system of the Persian poetic meter.

Out of this confluence of choices, the Ottoman Turkish language—which was always highly distinct from standard Turkish—was effectively born. This style of writing under Persian and Arabic influence came to be known as "Divan literature" (Turkish divân edebiyatı), as divân was the Ottoman Turkish word referring to the collected works of a poet.

Beginning with the Tanzimat reform period (1839–1876) of Ottoman history and continuing until the dissolution of the empire in the early 20th century, the Divan poetic tradition steadily dwindled, and more and more influence from both Turkish folk literature and European literature began to make itself felt.

Divan

Mesnevi
Mesnevi (masnavi or mathnavi) in literary term "Rhyming Couplets of Profound Spiritual Meaning" is style developed in Persian poetry which Nizami Ganjavi and Jami are the famous poets of type. In Turkic literature first mesnevi was Yusuf Has Hajib's Kutadgu Bilig.  Generally social concepts Ferdowsi's Shahnameh, Fuzûlî's Leyla ile Mecnun'u, military events, educational concepts such as Yusuf Nabi's  or related to religion or philosophy such as Mevlana's (Rumi) Masnavi is covered.

A peculiarity of the masnavi of the Ottoman period is that they almost always possess, beneath the literal meaning, a subtle spiritual signification. Many poems, of Mesnevi of Mevlana and the Divan of Aşık Paşha examples of confessedly religious, moral, or mystic but a much larger number are allegorical. To this latter class belong almost all the long romantic mesnevis of the Persian and mid Ottoman poets; in the stories of the loves of Leyla and Mecnun, Yusuf and Zuleykha, Kusrev and Shavin, Suleyman and Ebsal, and a hundred of like kind, can see pictured, if we look beneath the surface, the soul of man for God, or the yearning of the human heart after heavenly light and wisdom. There is not a character introduced into those romances but represents the passion not an incident but has some spiritual meaning. In the history of Iskender, or Alexander, we watch the noble human soul in its struggles against the powers of this world, and, when aided by God and guided by the heavenly wisdom of righteous teachers, its ultimate victory over every earthly passion, and its attainment of that point of divine serenity whence it can look calmly down on all sublunary things.

Kaside
Kaside is generally about God, religious or government leaders and their values. Most famous poets are Ahmed Paşa, Necati, Bâkî, Nedîm, most importantly Nef'i.

Terminology:
Tevhid: About the Unity of God.
Münacaat:  Prayer to God
Naat: About religious leaders and the prophet.
Methiye: About the sultan and government leaders.
Nesip or teşbib: Nature and environment descriptions.
Girizgah: Prelude to the topic.
Fahriye: Praising the poet himself
Dua: Prayer and well wishing for the subject of the poem

See also
 Kashifi
 Gazel
 Persian metres
 Şemi

Notes

References
 Gibb, E.J.W. Ottoman Literature: The Poets and Poetry of Turkey. .
 Tanpınar, Ahmet Hamdi. 19'uncu Asır Türk Edebiyatı Tarihi. İstanbul: Çağlayan Kitabevi, 1988.

External links
Divan-Full Text-Republic of Turkey Ministry of Culture and Tourism
Masnavi-Full Text-Republic of Turkey Ministry of Culture and Tourism

 
Poetry by country